"King of Rock and Roll" is a nickname most commonly associated with American singer Elvis Presley (1935–1977).

King of Rock and Roll or similar may also refer to:
 Several other musicians, see honorific nicknames in popular music
 "King of Rock and Roll" (song), a song by Dio
 "The King of Rock 'n' Roll", a song by Prefab Sprout
 The King of Rock and Roll, a studio album by Little Richard
 The King of Rock 'n' Roll: The Complete 50's Masters, a compilation album by Elvis Presley

See also
 King of Pop (disambiguation)
 Queen of Pop (disambiguation)
 Queen of Soul (disambiguation)